Chal Bardin (also Romanized as Chāl Bardīn) is a village in Gol Gol Rural District, in the Central District of Kuhdasht County, Lorestan Province, Iran. At the 2006 census, its population was 36, in 6 families.

References 

Towns and villages in Kuhdasht County